Epichostis termiprotrusa is a moth in the family Xyloryctidae. It was described by Yuan and Wang in 2009. It is found in China.

References

Epichostis
Moths described in 2009